Uzcátegui (Spanish pronunciation: usˈkateɣi) is a Basque surname. Notable people with the surname include:

Aymet Uzcátegui (born 1995), Venezuelan tennis player
José Uzcátegui (born 1990), Venezuelan boxer

Basque-language surnames